Kilvaxter is a crofting township on the Trotternish peninsula of the Isle of Skye in the Highlands of Scotland. It is in the council area of Highland. The A855 road passes through the area. A Souterrain exists close to Kilvaxter, and was discovered in April 2000, when a lintel collapsed, and it became visible at the surface. It was excavated and is now open to the public.

References

Populated places in the Isle of Skye